FC Temp Shepetivka was a Ukrainian football club from Shepetivka. In the winter of 1996 the club was dissolved and replaced with "artificial" team based on the Kamianets-Podilskyi sports school to finish the season.

History
The club was situated in Shepetivka, Ukraine. Temp Shepetivka took part in the first Ukrainian Premier League season in 1992, after being initially chosen to participate for winning the Cup of the Ukrainian SSR among amateur teams in 1991.

The chairman of the club was Dzhumber Nishnianidze.

Temp Shepetivka took last place in its group that season and was demoted to the Persha Liha as a result. The club later resurfaced for two more seasons, achieving a 9th place in the 1993–94 season of the Ukrainian Premier League.

In 1995, the club merged with FC Advis Khmelnytskyi and was renamed to Temp-ADVIS and moved to Khmelnytskyi. After its relegation to the First League it was renamed to "Ratusha" and played its games in Kamianets-Podilsky. Because of its unsuccessful season, the club then became defunct.

Honors
Cup of the Ukrainian SSR
Winners (1): 1991

League and cup history

 Soviet Union
{|class="wikitable"
|-bgcolor="#efefef"
! Season
! Div.
! Pos.
! Pl.
! W
! D
! L
! GS
! GA
! P
!Ukrainian Cup
!colspan=2|Europe
!Notes
|-
|align=center rowspan=2|1990
|align=center rowspan=2|4th
|align=center bgcolor=gold|1
|align=center|30
|align=center|24
|align=center|4
|align=center|2
|align=center|69
|align=center|20
|align=center|52
|align=center rowspan=2|
|align=center rowspan=2|
|align=center rowspan=2|
|align=center|qualified for the final
|-
|align=center|4
|align=center|5
|align=center|2
|align=center|1
|align=center|2
|align=center|7
|align=center|8
|align=center|5
|align=center bgcolor=lightgreen|Promoted
|-
|align=center|1991
|align=center|3rd 
|align=center|9
|align=center|50
|align=center|19
|align=center|15
|align=center|16
|align=center|64
|align=center|53
|align=center|53
|align=center bgcolor=gold|Winner
|align=center|
|align=center|
|align=center bgcolor=lightgreen|Promoted
|}

 Ukraine
{|class="wikitable"
|-bgcolor="#efefef"
! Season
! Div.
! Pos.
! Pl.
! W
! D
! L
! GS
! GA
! P
!Domestic Cup
!colspan=2|Europe
!Notes
|-
|align=center|1992
|align=center|1st
|align=center bgcolor=pink|10
|align=center|18
|align=center|2
|align=center|4
|align=center|12
|align=center|9
|align=center|34
|align=center|8
|align=center|1/32 finals
|align=center|
|align=center|
|align=center bgcolor=pink|Group A Relegated
|-
|align=center|1992–93
|align=center|2nd
|align=center bgcolor=silver|2
|align=center|42
|align=center|25
|align=center|8
|align=center|9
|align=center|68
|align=center|48
|align=center|58
|align=center|1/8
|align=center|
|align=center|
|align=center bgcolor=green|Promoted
|-
|align=center|1993–94
|align=center|1st
|align=center|9
|align=center|34
|align=center|12
|align=center|8
|align=center|14
|align=center|39
|align=center|38
|align=center|32
|align=center|1/8
|align=center|
|align=center|
|align=center|
|-
|align=center|1994–95
|align=center|1st
|align=center bgcolor=pink|17
|align=center|34
|align=center|10
|align=center|4
|align=center|20
|align=center|31
|align=center|41
|align=center|34
|align=center|1/4
|align=center|
|align=center|
|align=center bgcolor=pink|three-point systemRlegated
|-
|align=center|1995–96
|align=center|2nd
|align=center bgcolor=pink|21
|align=center|42
|align=center|6
|align=center|2
|align=center|34
|align=center|14
|align=center|103
|align=center|20
|align=center|
|align=center|
|align=center|
|align=center bgcolor=pink|RlegatedFolded
|}

See also
 FC Advis Khmelnytskyi

References

External links
 History of FC Temp Shepetivka. Shepetivka city website. 13 May 2012
 Kuzmiak, L. Recollections about Shepetivka football situation, meeting with Akhat Bragin, and football training in Ukraine, Yuriy Vazhykovych shared with the journalist of "Ukrainian football". Ukrainian football website.
 Yesiunin, S., Malyshev, Yu. When the middle is not gold''. Football Federation of Ukraine website. 1 December 2011
 Dzhumber Nishnianidze was mourned at the Lokomotyv Stadium. Shepetivka city website.

 
Football clubs in Khmelnytskyi Oblast
Defunct football clubs in Ukraine
Sport in Khmelnytskyi, Ukraine
Sport in Kamianets-Podilskyi
Association football clubs established in 1990
1990 establishments in Ukraine
Association football clubs disestablished in 1996
1996 disestablishments in Ukraine
Sports team relocations